Daniel O'Leary (1 September 1877 – 31 March 1951) was an Irish politician, farmer and vintner. He was an unsuccessful independent candidate at the 1923 general election, but was elected to Dáil Éireann as a Cumann na nGaedheal Teachta Dála (TD) for the Cork North constituency at the September 1927 general election. 

He was re-elected at the 1932 and 1933 general elections. At the 1937 general election, he was elected as a Fine Gael TD for the Cork West constituency. He lost his seat at the 1938 general election, and was an unsuccessful candidate at the 1943 and 1944 general elections.

References

1877 births
1951 deaths
Independent politicians in Ireland
Cumann na nGaedheal TDs
Fine Gael TDs
Members of the 6th Dáil
Members of the 7th Dáil
Members of the 8th Dáil
Members of the 9th Dáil
Politicians from County Cork
Irish farmers